Nakakoba Dam is a concrete gravity dam located in Saga Prefecture in Japan. The dam is used for flood control, water supply and power production. The catchment area of the dam is 13.5 km2. The dam impounds about 31  ha of land when full and can store 6800 thousand cubic meters of water. The construction of the dam was started on 1978 and completed in 2007.

References

Dams in Saga Prefecture
2007 establishments in Japan